Nomos 4000 ("Law 4000") is a 1962 Greek drama film directed and written by Giannis Dalianidis and starring Zoi Laskari and Vasilis Diamantopoulos.  The film was produced by Finos Films.  The title is derived from the Greek Law 4000/1958 about teddy boyism.

Plot
Andreas Ikonomou (Vasilis Diamantopoulos) was a strict father and a High School teacher which he taught Giorgos (Vangelis Voulgaridis). The latter  fell in love with the daughter (and only child) of Andreas, Maria (Zoi Laskari).

An incident in the school results in teacher's being aware of the relationship between his student and his daughter, who has an abortion. In another school incident, a student, called Evangelou, mocks Mr Andreas during the lesson by drawing him with ears of a donkey, causing the teacher's fury and the eventual expulsion of the boy from the school. Then, the same student is lured by some thugs to splash yogurt on his teacher. After his action, the perpetrator is caught by police and has his head shaved and be paraded with a sign reading about his offense.

The movie sold 118,841 tickets.

Cast
Zoi Laskari as Maria Economou
Kostas Voutsas as Renos
Vangelos Voulgaridis as Giorgos Anagnostou
Vasilis Diamantopoulos as Andreas Economou
Eleni Zafeiriou  as Andreas' wife
Spyros Moussouris as Giorgos' father
Hloi Liaskou as Maria's friend
Katerina Gogou  as Maria's friend
Athena Michailidou as Giorgos' mother

External links

Law 4000 at Finos Films
Law 4000 at cine.gr 

1962 films
Greek drama films
1960s Greek-language films
1962 drama films
Films directed by Giannis Dalianidis